Berit Bertling Cappelen (born 1966 Trondheim) is a Norwegian novelist. She lives in Oslo. She was twice denied admittance to the Norwegian Authors' Association.

Works
 Olwyns saga series

Forrådt, Cappelen, 2004
Jomfrurov, Cappelen, 2004
Dødskysset, Cappelen, 2004
Skyggespill, Cappelen, 2005
Fortapt, Cappelen, 2005
Maktbegjær, Cappelen, 2005
Flukt, Cappelen, 2005
Fare, Cappelen, 2005
Sverdslag, Cappelen, 2005
Ravnetid, Cappelen, 2006

 Solsiden saga,
Sort diamant, Cappelen, 2005
Isdronning, Cappelen, 2005
Purpursommerfugl, Cappelen, 2005
Kråkesølv, Cappelen, 2005
Snøroser, Cappelen, 2006
Fløyelsløgner, Cappelen, 2006
Gnistregn, Cappelen, 2006
Blonde dager, Cappelen, 2006
Fremtidsminner, Cappelen, 2006
Stjernestøv, Cappelen, 2006

Milla og stallkrigen, Aschehoug, 2009, 
Milla og midnattsmysteriet, Aschehoug, 2009,

References

1966 births
Living people
20th-century Norwegian novelists
21st-century Norwegian novelists
Norwegian women novelists
21st-century Norwegian women writers
20th-century Norwegian women writers
Cappelen family